Kolmonen or III divisioona is the fourth level in the league system of Finnish football and comprises 104 Finnish football teams. The III divisioona was introduced in 1973 and in the mid-1990s became known as the Kolmonen (Number Three in English and Trean in Swedish).

The competition 
There are 104 clubs in the Kolmonen, divided in 9 groups of 10 to 12 teams each representing a geographical area. During the course of a season (starting in April and ending in October) each club plays the others twice, once at their home ground and once at that of their opponents. The top team in each Kolmonen group is promoted to Kakkonen and the two lowest placed teams are normally relegated to the Nelonen.

Administration

Football Association of Finland (SPL)

There were 9 sections which were divided on a regional basis with between 10 and 12 teams in each.

District Football Associations

Since 1996 the administration of the Kolmonen has been delegated to the 12 district authorities of the SPL.  Responsibilities for the 10 sections are divided as follows:

 SPL Helsinki and SPL Uusimaa - 3 sections
 SPL Kaakkois-Suomi - 1 section
 SPL Itä-Suomi and SPL Keski-Suomi SPL - 1 section
 SPL Pohjois-Suomi - 1 section
 SPL Keski-Suomi and SPL Vaasa  - 1 section
 SPL Satakunta - 1 section
 SPL Tampere - 1 section
 SPL Turku and Åland FF - 1 section

Teams within the Kolmonen are eligible to compete in the Suomen Cup and the Suomen Regions' Cup. The clubs are normally listed in an abbreviated form and their full names can be viewed by referring to the List of clubs or the relevant District Association.

Current clubs - 2015 season

Helsinki and Uusimaa - Lohko 1 (Section 1)
 EIF/Akademi, Ekenäs, Raseborg
 FC Espoo, Espoo
 FC HIK, Hanko
 FC POHU, Helsinki
 HPS, Helsinki
 KäPa/Pule, Helsinki
 LoPa, Lohja
 NuPS, Nummela, Vihti
 PK-35, Helsinki
 Pöxyt, Espoo
 Tikka, Espoo
 Töölön Taisto, Helsinki

Helsinki and Uusimaa - Lohko 2 (Section 2)
 EsPa, Espoo
 FC Vantaa, Vantaa
 HerTo, Helsinki
 HIFK/2, Helsinki
 I-HK/OMV, Vantaa
 LPS, Helsinki
 NouLa, Järvenpää
 MPS/Atletico Malmi, Helsinki
 PPJ, Helsinki
 SAPA, Helsinki
 SibboV, Sipoo
 TuPS, Tuusula

Helsinki and Uusimaa - Lohko 3 (Section 3)
 Akilles, Porvoo
 FC Kontu, Helsinki
 FC Viikingit 2, Helsinki
 HyPS, Hyvinkää
 Lahen Pojat JS, Lahti
 MPS, Helsinki
 PK K-U/Allianssi, Kerava
 Ponnistajat, Helsinki
 PuiU, Helsinki
 Reipas, Lahti
 RiPS, Riihimäki
 Spartak, Helsinki

Kaakkois-Suomi (South-East Finland)
 FC Peltirumpu, Kouvola
 HaPK, Hamina
 IPS, Imatra
 Kultsu FC 2, Lappeenranta
 KuP, Savonlinna
 Lappee JK, Lappeenranta
 MiKi, Mikkeli
 PeKa, Kotka
 PEPO, Lappeenranta
 Purha, Inkeroinen, Kouvola
 SavU, Mikkeli
 STPS, Savonlinna

Itä- and Keski-Suomi (Eastern Finland and Central)
 FC Blackbird, Jyväskylä
 FC Villiketut, Jyväskylä
 JIlves, Jämsänkoski, Jämsä
 JoPS, Joensuu
 JPS, Jyväskylä
 Kings SC, Kuopio
 PK-37, Iisalmi
 SC KuFu-98, Kuopio
 SC Riverball, Joensuu
 SiPS, Siilinjärvi
 Warkaus JK, Varkaus
.

Pohjois-Suomi (Northern Finland)
 AS Moon, Raahe
 FC Kemi, Kemi
 JS Hercules, Oulu
 KajHa, Kajaani
 KTU, Kello, Oulu
 OLS, Oulu
 OPS Akatemia, Oulu
 ORPa, Oulu
 RoPo, Rovaniemi
 Spartak Kajaani, Kajaani
 Tervarit, Oulu

Keski-Pohjanmaa and Vaasa (Central Ostrobothnia and Vaasa)
 Esse IK, Esse, Pedersöre
 FC Kiisto a-team, Vaasa
 FC Korsholm, Korsholm
 HBK, Kronoby
 KPV Akatemia, Kokkola
 Närpes Kraft 2, Närpes
 Norrvalla FF, Vörå
 SIF, Vaasa
 Sisu-Pallo, Seinäjoki
 Sporting, Kristinestad
 VPS-j, Vaasa
 Virkiä, Lapua

Tampere and Satakunta
 FC Jazz 2, Pori
 FC Rauma, Rauma
 Härmä, Hämeenlinna
 Ilves 2, Tampere
 Loiske, Lempäälä
 NoPS, Nokia
 PJK, Pirkkala
 PS-44, Valkeakoski
 TKT, Tampere
 TOVE, Pori 
 TP-T, Tampere
 TPV 2, Tampere

Turku and Ahvenanmaa (Turku and Åland)
 FC Åland, (Finström, Hammarland, Saltvik and Sund)
 FC Boda, Björkboda, Kimitoön
 JIK, Jomala
 JyTy, Turku
 LTU, Littoinen, Kaarina
 PaiHa, Paimio
 PIF, Pargas
 SoVo, Somero
 TuWe, Turku
 TPK, Turku
 VG-62, Naantali
 Wilpas, Salo

Seasons - League Tables

Footnotes

External links
ResultCode
AnnaBet statistics (English)
kolmonen summary(English)(SOCCERWAY)

 
4
Fin
Professional sports leagues in Finland